Chaguarpamba is a canton in the Province of Loja Ecuador. Its seat is Chaguarpamba. The canton is located in the north of the province and is bordered by the cantons of Catamayo, Olmedo, Paltas, and the province of El Oro.  The name is Quichua for "Valley of Jaguars."  It occupies an area of 311.7 km2 at an altitude of 1050 m, with a population of 10,403.  Average temperature is between 18 and 24 °C

Chaguarpamba is noted for its coffee.

Demographics
Ethnic groups as of the Ecuadorian census of 2010:
Mestizo  95.7%
White  2.3%
Montubio  1.3%
Afro-Ecuadorian  0.6%
Indigenous  0.1%
Other  0.0%

References

Cantons of Loja Province